Elizabeth Yates (née Oman, 1840 – 6 September 1918) was a New Zealand politician who served as the mayor of Onehunga borough for most of 1894. She was the first female mayor in the British Empire. Outside the British Empire, she was preceded by Susanna M. Salter who was elected mayor of Argonia, Kansas in 1887. Onehunga is now part of the city of Auckland.

Life 
Yates was born Elizabeth Oman in Caithness, Scotland in 1840. She came to New Zealand with her family in November 1852 aboard the Berwick Castle and apparently lived in the Onehunga area from 1855 on. She married Michael Yates, master mariner, in 1875. He was on the Onehunga Borough Council, a councillor from 1885 and mayor from 1888 to 1892.

Career 
Yates was already involved in politics through her strong support of the women's suffrage movement, as well as participation in the debates of the Auckland Union Parliament.

Earlier in 1893, after her husband had stood down from his post due to ill health in 1892, she had accepted the nomination for the office of mayor and in November defeated her opponent, F. W. Court, at the polls (also automatically becoming a Justice of the Peace) in a close race decided by only 13 votes. Yates became mayor of Onehunga on 16 January 1894. The election made international news and brought her congratulations from Premier Richard Seddon and Queen Victoria.

She was met with strong opposition from a hard core of local councillors, town clerks and members of the public (four councillors and the town clerk resigned in response to her election), and they often disrupted meetings and orchestrated opposition to her every proposal. It is noted by some critics that she did not help her own cause by being 'tactless' and 'dictatorial' in her manner. In November 1894, mayoralty was again contested. Yates ran again but was defeated at the polls by a significant margin.

Yates later returned as a councillor to the Borough Council for two years between 1899 and 1901. Even her opponents conceded that she had been very effective during her short tenure, having liquidated the borough debt, established a sinking fund, reorganised the fire brigade, upgraded roads, footpaths and sanitation, and having personally lobbied the government to authorise the reopening of the Waikaraka cemetery.

Later life 
Following the death of her husband in 1902 and the decline of her political career, Yates suffered with dementia and alcoholism. She was committed to Auckland Mental Hospital in Avondale in 1909 until her death on 6 September 1918.

She was buried with her husband in the cemetery at St Peter's Anglican Church in Onehunga.

Yates and her husband are the subjects  in The World's First Lady Mayor, the second oldest surviving New Zealand  film restored by Ngā Taonga Sound and Vision, which was shot by photographer Enos Pegler in 1900.

Notes

References

External links 
|Elizabeth Yates entry on nzhistory.net.nz
Yates memorial on Stuff 
1900 film of Elizabeth Yates on Ngā Taonga Sound and Vision

Mayors of Onehunga
1840 births
1918 deaths
1900s in New Zealand cinema
Scottish emigrants to New Zealand
New Zealand feminists
Women mayors of places in New Zealand
People from Caithness
19th-century New Zealand politicians
20th-century New Zealand politicians
19th-century New Zealand women
20th-century New Zealand women politicians
New Zealand suffragists
19th-century women politicians
New Zealand justices of the peace